Karl Wilhelm Reinmuth (4 April 1892 in Heidelberg – 6 May 1979 in Heidelberg) was a German astronomer and a prolific discoverer of 395 minor planets.

Scientific career 
From 1912 to 1957, Reinmuth was working as an astronomer at the Heidelberg Observatory an astronomical observatory on the Königstuhl hill above Heidelberg in southern Germany. He was a member at the minor planet studies group at Astronomisches Rechen-Institut between 1947 and 1950, and later became "Oberobservator" or chief-observer at Heidelberg Observatory until his retirement in 1957. Reinmuth obtained more than 12,500 precise astrometric measurements of minor planets' positions on photographic plates, an enormous accomplishment before computer-based assistance existed.

Honours 
The outer main-belt asteroid 1111 Reinmuthia, discovered by himself at Heidelberg in 1912, was named in his honour.

Discoveries 
Among his most notable discoveries are the two near-Earth objects (NEOs) 1862 Apollo, the namesake of the Apollo group which became the largest group of asteroids within the NEO category with nearly 8,000 members, and 69230 Hermes, famous for being a lost asteroid for more than half a century until its recovery in 2003, and for being the only unnumbered but named asteroid during that period.

He also discovered several large Jupiter trojans including 911 Agamemnon, 1143 Odysseus, 1172 Äneas, 1173 Anchises, 1208 Troilus, 1404 Ajax, 1437 Diomedes and 1749 Telamon. The main-belt asteroid 5535 Annefrank, which he discovered in 1942 during World War II, was later visited by the Stardust spacecraft in 2002. His lowest numbered minor planet discovery is 796 Sarita, an asteroid from the middle region of the main-belt. Reinmuth also discovered two periodic comets of the Jupiter family, namely 30P/Reinmuth and 44P/Reinmuth.

Meta-naming 
The initials of the minor planets  through , all discovered by Reinmuth, spell out "G. Stracke". Gustav Stracke was a German astronomer and orbit computer, who had asked that no planet be named after him. In this manner Reinmuth was able to honour the man whilst honouring his wish:
 1227 Geranium 
 1228 Scabiosa
 1229 Tilia 
 1230 Riceia 
 1231 Auricula
 1232 Cortusa
 1233 Kobresia
 1234 Elyna

Later 1019 Strackea, also discovered by Reinmuth, was named after Stracke.

List of discovered minor planets 

Karl Reinmuth is credited by the Minor Planet Center with the discovery of 395 minor planets made during 1914–1957, with an interruption from April 1943 to July 1949 due to the end and the aftermath of WWII.

Works 
 The Herschel nebulas, De Gruyter, Berlin 1926 
 Catalog of 6.500 exact photographic positions of small planets, brown, Karlsruhe 1953

References

External links

Obituaries 
 MPBu 7 (1979) 10
 MitAG 50 (1980) 7 

1892 births
1979 deaths
Discoverers of asteroids
Discoverers of comets

20th-century German astronomers
Scientists from Heidelberg